Fudges (also Fudges Store) is a ghost town in Chester County, South Carolina, United States.

Notes

Geography of Chester County, South Carolina
Ghost towns in South Carolina